Philip O'Donohue (8 August 1926 – 2 June 1994) was an Australian rules footballer who played with Hawthorn in the Victorian Football League (VFL).

He was the younger brother of Hawthorn player Peter O'Donohue.

Notes

External links 

1926 births
1994 deaths
Australian rules footballers from Victoria (Australia)
Hawthorn Football Club players